Italy national bobsleigh team is the selection that represents Italy in international bobsleigh competitions.

The Italian bobsleigh's body is traditionally painted with the rosso corsa, the international auto racing colour informally assigned to Italy.

History 

The sport of bobsleigh began to spread in Italy at the beginning of the 20th century, especially in Trentino and Veneto, where Federico Terschak introduced it in Cortina d'Ampezzo. In 1922, the first Italian bobsleigh championship was organised along the road of Falzarego Pass, while the following year Raffaele Zardini built the bobsleigh track in Ronco.

The Italian bobsleigh team debuted at the 1924 Winter Olympics in Chamonix with the five-man bobsleigh.

In 1925 the Bob Club of Italy was founded, which the following year established the Italian Ice Sports Federation (Federazione italiana sport del ghiaccio, FISG), which also included the Italian Skating Federation (Federazione italiana di pattinaggio) and the Italian Ice Hockey Federation (Federazione italiana di hockey sul ghiaccio).

At the 1930 World Bobsleigh Championships in Caux-sur-Montreux, first edition of the event organised by the International Bobsleigh and Skeleton Federation, the Italian national bobsleigh team won the gold medal with the four-man bobsleigh team of Franco Zaninetta, Giorgio Biasini, Antonio Dorini and Gino Rossi.

In 1933 the FISG was incorporated into the Italian Winter Sports Federation (Federazione Italiana Sport Invernali, FISI); in the same year the Mottarone bobsleigh track was built on the initiative of Luigi Tornielli, in view of the World University Championships.

After World War II, the Italian Winter Sports Federation turned to the Italian Air Force to look for future Italian bobsleighers among fighter pilots, imitating the US strategy: after a special course, Marshal Lamberto Dalla Costa and Major Giacomo Conti were chosen and took part in the FIBT World Championships 1953 in Garmisch. The debut of Eugenio Monti, known as the "Flying Red" (Rosso volante), who dominated the world bobsleigh scene in the 1950s and 1960s, dates back to these years. The first Italian successes were achieved at home at the 1956 Winter Olympics in Cortina d'Ampezzo, where, thanks to their excellent knowledge of the Olympic track and the innovative Podar bobsleighs, the Italian national team won the gold and silver medals in the two-man bobsleigh and the silver in the four-man bobsleigh.

After the extraordinary olympic success at Cortina, and the subsequent opening of the Blue Lake bobsleigh run in Cervinia in 1963, the Italian Air Force became increasingly interested in the sport and its acceleration on bends, which was useful for training its pilots. A 'bobsleigh school' was opened, renamed in 1965 as the 'Armed Forces Bobsleigh School', to train pilots, interiors and brakemen. In 1973, Italy's national military team was formed, which took part in the first edition of Military World Bobsleigh Championships in Cervinia.

After a break of more than 30 years, the Air Force Sports Centre resumed winter sports activities in 2012 so that its athletes could take part in the 2014 Winter Olympics in Sochi.

Participation in the Winter Olympics 

The Italian national bobsleigh team has always taken part in at least one discipline at every Winter Olympics (except at Squaw Valley in 1960, when the organising committee did not organise any bobsleight competitions for economic reasons), winning a total of 12 Olympic medals.

Italian women made their debut with the two-woman bobsleigh at the 2002 Winter Olympics in Salt Lake City, while in Turin 2006 they won their first and so far only medal.

The largest number of Olympic medals (six) was won by Eugenio Monti, known as the Rosso volante ('Flying Red'), in whose memory the Olympic track in Cortina d'Ampezzo was named.

Men's four-man bobsleigh

Men's two-man bobsleigh

Women's two-woman bobsleigh

Olympic medals

Olympic medalists

Reference

Bibliography

See also 

 Italy at the Olympics
 Rosso corsa
 Eugenio Monti olympic track
 Cesana Pariol

External links 
 
 

Bobsleigh in Italy
Italy
Italian bobsledders
National sports teams of Italy